The 2012 Ankara Cup was a professional tennis tournament played on indoor hard courts. It was the second edition of the tournament which was part of the 2012 ITF Women's Circuit. It took place in Ankara, Turkey, on 17–23 December 2012.

Singles entrants

Seeds 

 1 Rankings as of 10 December 2012

Other entrants 
The following players received wildcards into the singles main draw:
  Başak Eraydın
  Sultan Gönen
  Pemra Özgen
  İpek Soylu

The following players received entry from the qualifying draw:
  Nigina Abduraimova
  Kristina Barrois
  Yuliya Kalabina
  Ana Savić

The following players received entry into the singles main draw as lucky losers:
  Ons Jabeur
  Danka Kovinić

The following player received entry by a Protected Ranking:
  Oksana Kalashnikova

Champions

Singles 

  Ana Savić def.  Monica Puig 5–7, 6–3, 6–4

Doubles 

  Magda Linette /  Katarzyna Piter def.  Irina Buryachok /  Valeria Solovyeva 6–2, 6–2

External links 
 Official website
 2012 Ankara Cup at ITFtennis.com

2012 ITF Women's Circuit
2012 in Turkish tennis
Ankara Cup
December 2012 sports events in Turkey